The Viterra Championship is the Manitoba men's provincial curling championship.  The tournament is run by Curl Manitoba, the provincial curling association. The winner represents Manitoba at the Tim Hortons Brier, the Canadian men's championship.

The tournament was previously known as the Safeway Championship (2008–2015), Safeway Select (1995–2007); the Labatt Tankard (1980–1994); the British Consols (1937–1979) and the Macdonald Brier Trophy event winner at the MCA Bonspiel (1925-1936).

Qualification
32 teams qualify. The distribution of berths changes from year to year but is generally composed of the following:
Winners of Regional Zone Playdowns
Winners of a "Berth Bonspiel"
Brandon Men's Bonspiel winner
Defending champion
Manitoba Curling Tour champion
Top team(s) from the Manitoba Curling Tour Rankings
Top Manitoba team(s) on the CTRS rankings
Top teams from the Manitoba Curling Association Bonspiel

Winners

Listed below are the provincial champion skips for each year. Manitoba did not participate in the 1927 Brier. Brier champions in bold.

References

The Brier provincial tournaments
Curling in Manitoba